TRT 4 was a Turkish television program. Before 2008, it was a TV station which broadcast cultural and educational programs in Turkey.

Introduction 

TRT 4 started test transmissions in 1990 as "4. Kanal", and is now TRT's frequently watched TV station.

In the past, the channel broadcast educational programs (correspondence courses).

Afterward TRT 4 started broadcast the repeats of Turkish folk, documentaries and classical music programming.

From 1 November 2008, its broadcast times are: 21:00 - 07:00 (EET) after the release of TRT Çocuk, It has many subprograms. TRT 4 logo replaced TRT Çocuk logo during the program.

Currently TRT 4 shows programs of TRT Müzik channel.

Close at night 

During late 2008 to late 2009, TRT 4 is only channel of TRT that close to the testcard at night. While before that TRT 3 also close from 1am to 5am. And before 2003 TRT 1 and TRT 2 also close at night.

Logos and identities

See also 

 Turkish Radio and Television Corporation
 List of television stations in Turkey

External links 

 TRT's Official Website 
 TRT 4 Broadcasting Schedule
 Watch TRT 4/TRT Çocuk live Online
 TRT 4 at LyngSat Address

Defunct television channels in Turkey
Turkish-language television stations
Television channels and stations established in 1990
Television channels and stations disestablished in 2011
1990 establishments in Turkey